Üç Korkusuz Arkadaş is a 1966 Turkish war drama film, directed by Halit Refiğ and starring Tanju Gürsu, Nilüfer Aydan and Kuzey Vargin.

References

External links
Üç Korkusuz Arkadaş at the Internet Movie Database

1966 films
Turkish war drama films
1960s war drama films
Films directed by Halit Refiğ
1966 drama films
Turkish swashbuckler films